The Osage Hills is a hilly area in Oklahoma, commonly known as The Osage.  The name refers to the broad rolling hills and rolling tallgrass prairie and Cross Timbers encompassing Osage County and surrounding areas, including portions of Mayes, Tulsa, Washington and Kay Counties. The Osage is the southern extension of the Flint Hills of Kansas.

The Osage
The Osage contains some of the largest remaining remnants of the tallgrass prairie that covered much of the Great Plains (see Tallgrass Prairie Preserve). Kansans generally refer to the northern portion of this same prairie system as the Flint Hills.

Historically, most of this area was the last reserve of the Osage Indians and its rugged environs hid outlaws and illicit activity well into the twentieth century. The Nellie Johnstone No. 1, a well drilled near present-day Bartlesville, struck oil on April 15, 1897, and became the first of thousands of commercial oil wells in Oklahoma. The Osage Indians had wisely held on to their mineral rights following the dissolution of the reservation system, and the royalties from the oil underneath the hills made them one of the richest tribes in the nation.

Prominent attractions in the Osage Hills include: the Osage Hills State Park; Tulsa's Gilcrease Museum (which has extensive gardens covering ,   Woolaroc  and The Nature Conservancy's Tallgrass Prairie Preserve which offers long vistas of tallgrass prairies and buffalo herds; and Kaw Lake and the Arkansas River in Kay Country which form the western boundary of the Osage.

Several enterprises or organizations in the area use Osage Hills to identify themselves with the area; including Osage Hills Public Schools in Bartlesville and Osage Hills State Park west of Bartlesville. Other areas within Oklahoma, Kansas, and Missouri also may use the name "Osage Hills" although may not actually be within the specific Osage Hills area.

Footnotes

Bibliography
Kappler, Charles (Ed.). "PART III.—ACTS OF FIFTY–NINTH CONGRESS—FIRST SESSION, 1906 (Chapter 3572, June 28, 1906 [H.R. 15333] - [Public, No. 321] 34 Stat., 539. "An act for the division of the lands and funds of the Osage Indians etc." Indian Affairs: Laws and Treaties. Washington: Government Printing Office, 1913. 3:252-258 (accessed September 25, 2006).

See also
Osage Indian murders
Osage Plains
Cincinnati Hill
Gilcrease Museum

External links
Osage Hills State Park website
Tallgrass Prairie Preserve

Hills of Oklahoma
Landforms of Mayes County, Oklahoma
Landforms of Osage County, Oklahoma
Landforms of Rogers County, Oklahoma
Landforms of Washington County, Oklahoma
Geography of Oklahoma